Chirumarri is a village in Mudigonda Mandal in Khammam District.

Geography

Demographics
According to Indian census 2011, village consists of 612 households with a population of 2,498, consisting of 1,292 males 1,206 females.

References

Villages in Khammam district